Beira Baixa may refer to the following places in Portugal:

Beira Baixa Province, a former administrative division
Beira Baixa (intermunicipal community), an administrative division